The Travelling Scholarships were established in 1944 to enable British creative writers to keep in touch with their colleagues abroad. As directed by the anonymous founder of the trust, the Scholarships are administered by the Society of Authors and applications are not accepted – recipients are nominated by the assessors for the year. In 2020 each awardee received £1600.

List of prize winners

1940s
1946
 C. Day Lewis
 V.S. Pritchett
 William Sansom
1947
 Dylan Thomas
1948
 Julia Strachey
 George Barker
1949
 William Plomer
 Margiad Evans
 Jocelyn Brooke

1950s
1950
 David Gascoyne
1951
 Laurie Lee
1952 
 Vernon Watkins
1953 
 Arthur Calder-Marshall
1954 
 Charles Causley 
 F.P. Prince 
1956 
 Maurice Cranston 
 Vernon Watkins
1958 
 William Golding 
 Samuel Selvon

1960s
1960 
 Michael Swan
 John Whiting
1961 
 David Jones
1962 
 Frank Tuohy
1963 
 R. S. Thomas 
 Norman MacCaig
1964
 Christine Brooke-Rose
1965 
 Margaret Drabble
1966 
 Charles Causley
1967
 George Mackay Brown 
 Stevie Smith 
1968 
 Naomi Lewis
1969 
 Peter Vansittart

1970s
1970 
 Ronald Blythe
1971 
 William Trevor
1972 
 Norman Nicholson
1973 
 Philip Callow
1974 
 John McGahern
1975 
 Maureen Duffy
1976 
 Lettice Cooper 
 Gavin Ewart
1977 
 Philippa Pullar 
 Ted Walker
1978 
 Edward Blishen 
 Emyr Humphreys 
1979 
 Jacky Gillott
 Peter Porter

1980s
1980 
 D.J. Enright 
 Fay Weldon
1981 
 Douglas Dunn 
 Mervyn Jones
1982 
 Rosemary Dinnage 
 Richard Holmes
1983 
 U. A. Fanthorpe 
 Hilary Spurling
1984 
 Alan Brownjohn 
 P.N. Furbank 
 Martin Seymour-Smith 
 Jackie Kay
1985 
 John Griffith Bowen 
 Dan Jacobson 
 Norman and Jeanne MacKenzie
1986
 Shena Mackay 
 Vernon Scannell 
 Iain Crichton Smith
1987 
 A.L. Barker 
 Eva Figes 
 Allan Massie
 David Rudkin
1988 
 Sybille Bedford 
 David Harsent 
 Barry Hines
 Nicholas Wollaston
1989 
 Roy Heath 
 Adrian Mitchell 
 Elizabeth North

1990s
1990
 David Caute
 Roy Fisher
 David Hughes
 Robert Nye
1991
 Anne Devlin
 Elaine Feinstein
 Iain Sinclair
 Emma Tennant
1992
 Jim Crace
 Donald Davie
 Louis de Bernieres
1993
 Maurice Leitch
 Peter Levi
 Bernard MacLaverty
1994
 Peter Benson
 Jenny Joseph
1995
 Stewart Conn
 Annette Kobak
 Theo Richmond
1996
 William Palmer
 Jo Shapcott
 James Simmons
1997
 Dorothy Nimmo
 Dilys Rose
 Paul Sayer
1999
 Julia Blackburn
 David Hart
 David Mitchell

2000s
2000
 Robert Edric
 Georgina Hammick
 Grace Ingoldby
 Walter Perrie
2001
 Alan Judd
 Christina Koning
 Tessa Ransford
 Maurice Riordan
2002
 Frank Kuppner
 David Park
 George Szirtes
2003
 Kate Chisholm
 Jamie McKendrick
 Aonghas Macneacail
2004
 Tim Binding
 Colm Toibin
2005
 Anna Crowe
 Lavinia Greenlaw
2006
 Jenny Diski
 Robert Macfarlane
 Helen Simpson
2007
 Naomi Alderman
 Susan Elderkin
 Philip Marsden
2008
 Marina Lewycka
 Ruth Padel
 Colin Thubron
2009
 Paul Farley
 Eva Hoffman

2010s
2010
 Sam North
 Lemn Sissay
 Roma Tearne
2011
 Mark Cocker
 Rose George
 Ben Markovits
2012
 Stella Duffy
 Matthew Hollis
 Justin Marozzi
2013
 Kathleen Jamie
 Olivia Laing
 Elizabeth Cooke
 James Fergusson
2014
 Eimear McBride
 Daljit Nagra
 Michela Wrong
2015
 Tahmima Anam
 James Hall
 Philip Terry
 Rupert Thomson
2016
 Jamie Bartlett
 David Crane
 Peter Oswald
 David Szalay
2017
 Amy Liptrot
 Ross Raisin
 James Sheard
2018
 Jenn Ashworth
 Tash Aw
 Jessie Greengrass
 James Harpur
 Sudhir Hazareesingh
2019
 Kathryn Hughes
 Damian Le Bas
 Nadifa Mohamed
 Johny Pitts
 Gwendoline Riley

2020s
2020
 Luke Brown
 Inua Ellams
 Georgina Lawton
 Neil Rollinson
 Ahdaf Soueif
2021
 Clare Pollard
 Guy Gunaratne
 Lola Okolosie
 Tom Stevenson
 Yara Rodrigues Fowler
2022
 Linda Brogan
 Maame Blue
 Dylan Moore
 Ayisha Malik
 Ben Judah
 Alice Albinia

References

Society of Authors awards
British literary awards
Awards established in 1944